Hope Cemetery is a rural cemetery in Barre, Vermont.  The city calls itself the "Granite Capital of the World", and the cemetery is known for the superb granite craftsmanship on its memorials and tombstones. Barre is also home to the world's largest "deep hole" granite quarry, the Rock of Ages quarry, also known as the "E. L. Smith Quarry".

History 

Hope Cemetery was established in 1895, and then consisted of 53 acres. It was designed and planned by the renowned landscape architect Edward P. Adams.  By 1895, skilled artisans from around the world, especially Italy, had been flocking to Barre to become a part of the booming granite industry. One of the main uses of granite throughout the country was in tombstones and memorials. It is estimated that one-third of all memorials in the United States came from Barre.

Silicosis, a respiratory disease caused by granite dust, was common among the artisans and sculptors who were breathing it in every day, which led to an abnormally high death rate. In addition, the 1918–1919 Spanish flu epidemic caused many additional deaths, adding to the need for tombstones.  Knowing that death was imminent and possibly around the corner, many sculptors were given to designing their own tombstones to showcase their skill. It is estimated that 75% of the tombstones were designed by the occupants of the graves.

Today 
All of its stones are made from "Barre Grey" granite. The cemetery is a common tourist destination, and has been referred to as a "'Museum' of granite sculpture," the "Uffizi of Necropolises", by Vermont folklorist Joseph A. Citro, a "Gallery of granite artistry," a "sculpture garden" and a "Huge outdoor museum." Guided tours are available for a small fee, but driving or walking through the cemetery to look at the sculptures and memorials is common practice and encouraged.

It is still possible for ornate and unusual tombstones to be put into Hope Cemetery. These large memorials can range in cost from US$20,000–30,000+. Simple headstones cost about $2,000.

Hope is the largest  of three cemeteries managed by the city of Barre.  It was featured in a story run by the Associated Press, and was also featured in a segment in National Geographic on cities and towns in America. Additionally, the cemetery was among those profiled in the 2005 PBS documentary A Cemetery Special.

Artist Frank Gaylord (1925–2018), who created "The Column" of soldiers statues at the Korean War Veterans Memorial in Washington, D.C., is buried at Hope.

Gallery

Sources

External links
 
 

Cemeteries in Vermont
Cemetery art
Barre (city), Vermont
Buildings and structures in Washington County, Vermont
Tourist attractions in Washington County, Vermont
1895 establishments in Vermont
Rural cemeteries
Spanish flu monuments and memorials